HMS Glasgow was the Royal Scottish Naval vessel Royal Mary transferred to the Royal Navy by the Act of Union of 1707. Her design was based on the standardize 20-gun sixth rates. After commissioning she was assigned to Home Waters. She took a privateer in 1708 and another in 1712. She was sold in 1719.

Glasgow was the first vessel of this name in the Royal Navy.

Construction
She was built for the Scottish Navy on the Thames in 1696 then transferred by the Act of Union to the Royal Navy in 1707. Her builder's measure was 284 tons. She carried the standard armament of a sixth rate of twenty 6-pounders on the upper deck (UD) and four 4-pounders on the quarterdeck (QD). The 4-pounders were removed in August 1714.

Commissioned Service
She was commissioned in 1707 under the command of Commander James Hamilton, RN (promoted to captain in December 1707) for service at the Nore. James Hamilton had been her Captain in the Scottish Navy holding a Captain's rank under warrant of Queen Anne since 7 November 1705. Commander Thomas Egerton, RN was in command from January 1708 followed by Commander Walter Massey, RN from February 1708 with Admiral Byng's Fleet in the Downs and North Sea. On 1 May 1708 she took the privateer, La Fidele in the North Sea. Commander Thomas Dennett, RN (promoted Captain January 1713) took command. She captured privateer, L'Amazone in the North Sea on 30 May 1712. In 1713 she was on quarantine guard in the Downs. In 1714 she underwent a hull repair at Portsmouth at a cost of £634.5.71/4 for building. Her final commander was Captain William Lloyd, RN in February 1715 for service in the English Channel followed by the North Sea in 1717. She sailed with a Baltic Convoy in 1718.

Disposition
She was sold at Deptford for £115 on 20 August 1719.

Notes

Citations

References
 Winfield 2009, British Warships in the Age of Sail (1603 – 1714), by Rif Winfield, published by Seaforth Publishing, England © 2009, EPUB , Chapter 6, The Sixth Rates, Vessels acquired from 2 May 1660, Ex-Scottish Acquisitions, Glasgow
 Winfield 2007, British Warships in the Age of Sail (1714 – 1792), by Rif Winfield, published by Seaforth Publishing, England © 2007, EPUB , Chapter 6, Sixth Rates, Sixth Rates of 20 or 24 guns, Vessels in service at 1 August 1714, Ex-Scottish Acquisitions, Glasgow
 Colledge, Ships of the Royal Navy, by J.J. Colledge, revised and updated by Lt Cdr Ben Warlow and Steve Bush, published by Seaforth Publishing, Barnsley, Great Britain, © 2020, e  (EPUB), Section G (Glasgow)

 

1690s ships
Corvettes of the Royal Navy
Naval ships of the United Kingdom